The men's artistic gymnastics floor exercise competition at the 2019 European Games was held at the Minsk-Arena on 30 June 2019.

Qualification

The top six gymnasts with one per country advanced to the final.

Final

References 

Men's floor exercise}